Dexchlorpheniramine (trade name Polaramine) is an antihistamine with anticholinergic properties used to treat allergic conditions such as hay fever or urticaria. It is the pharmacologically active dextrorotatory isomer of chlorpheniramine.

It came into medical use in 1959 and was patented in 1962.

Pharmacology
Dexchlorpheniramine is an antihistamine, or an antagonist of the histamine H1 receptor. A study found that dexchlorpheniramine had a Ki value of 20 to 30 μM for the muscarinic acetylcholine receptors using rat brain tissue.

References

External links
 Polaramine consumer information
 Polaramine (dexchlorpheniramine) medical facts

Dimethylamino compounds
Chloroarenes
Enantiopure drugs
H1 receptor antagonists
Muscarinic antagonists
2-Pyridyl compounds